The Fire Theft is the debut and only studio album by American rock band The Fire Theft. This album was released September 23, 2003, through the independent record label Rykodisc. In September 2019, the service Run Out Groove made a poll on their site to test demand for vinyl reissues of their catalog, with one of the choices being The Fire Theft. The album won out, and was subsequently remastered and reissued with new artwork.

Track listing
 "Uncle Mountain" – 4:03
 "Waste Time Segue" – 1:02
 "Oceans Apart" – 4:15
 "Chain" – 3:43
 "Backwards Blues" – 2:46
 "Summertime" – 4:01
 "Houses" – 3:14
 "Waste Time" – 4:15
 "Heaven" – 4:12
 "Rubber Bands" – 4:01
 "It's Over" – 4:01
 "Carry You" – 4:22
 "Sinatra" – 14:49

Outtakes from this album include "Hands on You" and "Easy Whistle".
Some CD pressings omit "Waste Time Segue" showing "Oceans Apart" as track 2 and thus totaling only 12 tracks.  This led to confusion as to the song titles as each track number after "Uncle Mountain" is offset by one (i.e. "Sinatra" is listed as track 12 even though it is track 13).

Chart positions

Album

Personnel
The Band
Jeremy Enigk - guitar, vocals
Nate Mendel - bass guitar
William Goldsmith - drums, percussion
Billy Dolan - guitar

Orchestra
Violin: Gregg Rice, Ken Wright
Viola: Sam Williams
Cello: Dave Beck
Bass Violin: Phil Wright
French Horn: Roger Burnett
Bass Trombone and Tuba: Dan Marcus
Clarinet: Craig Flory
Bass Clarinet, Clarinets, Flute, Piccolo: Jim Dejoie
Glockenspiel: Jeremy Enigk
Girl Voice: Kelsey Mackin
Children's Choir: Kelsey Mackin, Ella Banyas, Lilliam Louden-Mosio, Julia Thomas, and Lauren Hill

Production
Produced by: Brad Wood and The Fire Theft
Mixed by: Brad Wood
Engineered by: Brad Wood, Jeremy Enigk, William Goldsmith, Greg Williamson, and Adam Wade.
Mastered at: Oasis Mastering
Recorded at: The Fire Theft STudio, Kirkland, WA; Brad's Guest House, Valley Village, CA; and The Park Studio, Studio City, CA.
Mixed at: The Park Studio, Studio City, CA
Management: Steve Smith/Smith Management Group
Booking U.S.: Jon Pleeter/The Agency Group
Booking UK: Russel Warby/The Agency Group
Legal: Stacy Fass

References 

2003 debut albums
Rykodisc albums
Albums produced by Brad Wood
The Fire Theft albums